The Pakistan national cricket team, captained by Mushtaq Mohammed, toured Australia in March 1979 and played two Test matches against the Australia national cricket team. The series was drawn 1–1. Pakistan visited Sri Lanka en route for home and played a match against the Sri Lankan national cricket team.

Test series summary

First Test

Second Test

Sri Lanka
The Pakistan team had a stopover in Colombo after leaving Australia and played a limited overs match there on 4 April 1979 against the Sri Lankan national cricket team. Pakistan won by 55 runs. Sri Lanka were captained by Anura Tennekoon.

References

Annual reviews
 Playfair Cricket Annual 1979
 Wisden Cricketers' Almanack 1980

Further reading
 Bill Frindall, The Wisden Book of Test Cricket 1877-1978, Wisden, 1979
 Chris Harte, A History of Australian Cricket, André Deutsch, 1993

1978–79 Australian cricket season
1979 in Australian cricket
1979 in Pakistani cricket
1979 in Sri Lankan cricket
International cricket competitions from 1975–76 to 1980
1979
1979
Sri Lankan cricket seasons from 1972–73 to 1999–2000